Rombi (Lombi) is a Bantu language spoken in the Meme department of the Southwest Province of southwestern Cameroon by the Barombi (Barumbi, Balombi) people.  It has a lexical similarity of 86% with Bankon, which is spoken in the nearby Moungo department of Littoral Province.

References

Languages of Cameroon
Basaa languages